This is a list of Italian television related events from 1988.

Events

 6 May. On an episode of the magazine Telefono giallo, hosted by Corrado Augias, about the Itavia flight 870, an airman in service in Marsala on the day of the crash (whose identity has never been ascertained), phones on air and declares to have seen the radar tracks of the event, before they were hidden by the Italian Air Force.

Debuts

RAI

Variety 

 Harem – feminist talk-show, hosted by Catherine Spaak, with three female guests and a male one, who only intervenes at the end; 15 seasons.
La tv delle ragazze (Girls TV) – satirical variety, hosted by Serena Dandini, written, directed and interpreted exclusively by women (save two male actors in minor roles); 2 seasons. It launches several comic actresses, as Monica Scattini and Angela Finocchiaro.

Mediaset

Serials 

 Casa Vianello (Vianello house) – sitcom with Raimondo Vianello and Sandra Mondaini; 16 seasons. The two actors play themselves, as two aged spouses, deeply united despite their perennial quarrels and his amorous adventures.

Variety 

 Striscia la notizia (The news crawls) – satirical news program, ideated by Antonio Ricci and again on air; irreverent comical sketches, played in studio by two fake news readers, alternate with more serious reportages about social issues. The show gets, for decades, the greatest audience in the Italian television and has got by the critics praises, but also charges of demagogy and sexism, for the intensive use of girls in sexy suits (the “velinas”). Among the many hosts of the program, the most successful had been the couple Ezio Greggio-Enzo Iachetti, while its most popular reporter is the puppet Gabibbo.

International
March -  The Green Hornet (Rai 1) (1966-1967)
2 March -  BraveStarr (Italia 1) (1987-1988)
September -  Bobobobs (Italia 1) (1988-1989)
17 September -  Jake and the Fatman (Canale 5) (1987-1992)
 Wisdom of the Gnomes (Italia 1) (1987-1988)
 Calimero (Rai 1) (1972-1975)
 Kissyfur (Rai 2) (1986-1990)
 Beauty and the Beast (Italia 1) (1987-1990)
 My Little Pony (Italia 1) (1984-1987)
 L.A. Law (Rai 1) (1986-1994)
 Laverne & Shirley (Canale 5) (1976-1983)
 Perfect Strangers (Canale 5) (1986-1993)
 Maho no Mako-chan (Italia 1) (1970-1971)
 Lady Lovely Locks (Italia 1) (1987-1988)
 C.A.T.S. Eyes (Rai 1) (1985-1987)
 Meatballs & Spaghetti (Rai 1) (1982-1983)
 Matlock (TMC) (1986-1995)
/// The Littles (Canale 5) (1983-1985)
 Teenage Mutant Ninja Turtles (Italia 7) (1987-1996)
 BraveStarr (Italia 1) (1987-1988)
 Down and Out in Beverly Hills (Rai 1) (1987)
 Moncchichis (Rai 1) (1983)
 Beverly Hills Teens (Italia 1) (1987)
 The Flintstone Kids (Rai 2) (1986-1988)
 ALF (Rai 2) (1986-1990)
 MacGyver (Italia 1) (1985-1992)

Television shows

RAI

Drama 

 Lenin... the train – by Damiano Damiani, with Ben Kingsley (Lenin), Leslie Caron (Nadezhda Krupskaya) and Dominique Sanda (Inessa Armand), script by Enzo Bettiza; in 2 episodes. Reconstruction of the Lenin’s trip on the sealed train.
 La coscienza di Zeno (Zeno's conscience) – by Sandro Bolchi, from the Italo Svevo’s novel, script by Tullio Kezich, with Johnny Dorelli (in an unusual dramatic role) and Ottavia Piccolo; in 2 episodes.
 Piazza Navona – cycle of 6 comedy TV-movies, realized by 6 debuting directors (Ricky Tognazzi among others) and produced and supervised by Ettore Scola; every episode takes place in the Roman square over the course of a day and includes a cameo of Marcello Mastroianni as himself.

Miniseries 

 The secret of the Sahara – by Alberto Negrin, with Andie MacDowell and Michael York, music by Ennio Morricone; 4 episodes. European coproduction inspired by Emilio Salgari and (uncredited) Pierre Benoit’s Atlantida.
 La piovra 4 – by Luigi Perelli, with Michele Placido, Patricia Millardet and Remo Girone; 6 episodes. The final chapter, where the hero of the series, the superintendent Corrado Cattani, is killed by the Mafia, gets 17 million viewers (score no more reached by any Italian fiction).

Variety 

 Complimenti per la trasmissione (Congratulations for the show) – game show with Piero Chiambretti (at his debut as host of a complete program). A RAI troupe breaks live in the house of an average family and subjects it to various tests; however, the games are just a pretext to show the reactions of the ordinary people to the TV cameras.   
Troppo forti (Too strong) –variety about the Italians’ dreams and desires, with Mara Venier (at her TV debut) and Claudio Sorrentino.

Mediaset

Serials 

 Balliamo e cantiamo con Licia (Let’s dance and sing with Licia) – third sequel of Love me Licia.
 Arriva Cristina (Here is Cristina) – spin-off of Love me Licia, aimed to a slightly older public; the bass player of the Bee Hive enters in the band of Cristina D’Avena (playing herself). The serial, despite its naivety, repeats the success of the original and has three sequel.

Births

Deaths

See also
List of Italian films of 1988

References